The  is an underground railway line operated by the private railway operator Seibu Railway in Japan. The line links the Seibu Ikebukuro Line at Nerima Station with the Tokyo Metro Yūrakuchō Line and Tokyo Metro Fukutoshin Line at Kotake-Mukaihara Station in Nerima, Tokyo.

Stations

Rolling stock

Seibu trains
Seibu 6000 series
Seibu 40000 series
Seibu 40050 series

Tokyo Metro trains
Tokyo Metro 10000 series
Tokyo Metro 17000 series

Tokyu trains
 Tokyu 5000 series
 Tokyu 5050 series
 Tokyu 5050-4000 series (since 10 September 2012)

Yokohama Minatomirai Railway trains

 Yokohama Minatomirai Railway Y500 series

Past rolling stock
Tokyo Metro 07 series

History
The line started out with the section between Shin-Sakuradai and Kotake-Mukaihara, and began through operations with the TRTA (now Tokyo Metro) Yūrakuchō Subway Line. At this point, the line did not connect with any other Seibu Line, so only TRTA trainsets were used. In 1994, the line was extended from Shin-Sakuradai to Nerima, connecting with the Seibu Ikebukuro Line. Because of track elevation work at Nerima, only one track was used. Later in 1998, the section between Shin-Sakuradai and Nerima became double-tracked, and through services with the Ikebukuro Line began.

Station numbering was introduced on all Seibu Railway lines during fiscal 2012, with Seibu Yurakucho Line stations numbered prefixed with the letters "SI" (part of the Seibu Ikebukuro group of lines).

From 10 September 2012, 10-car 5050-4000 series sets entered revenue service on the Seibu Yurakucho Line and Seibu Ikebukuro Line, with inter-running through to the Tokyo Metro Fukutoshin Line.

References

 
Railway lines in Tokyo
1067 mm gauge railways in Japan
Yūrakuchō Line